The Encyclopedia Astronautica is a reference web site on space travel. A comprehensive catalog of vehicles, technology, astronauts, and flights, it includes information from most countries that have had an active rocket research program, from Robert Goddard to the NASA Space Shuttle and the Soviet Buran programme.

Founded in 1994 and maintained for most of its existence by space enthusiast and author Mark Wade. He has been collecting such information for most of his life. Between 1996 and 2000 the site was hosted by Friends and Partners in Space. The site is no longer updated or maintained and is now considered as partially unreliable. Although it contains a great deal of information, not all of it is correct.

Reception and accolades
The American Astronautical Society gave the site the Ordway Award for Sustained Excellence in Spaceflight History which "recognizes exceptional, sustained efforts to inform and educate on spaceflight and its history through one or more media" in 2015, the award's initial year.

Telepolis journalist Marcus Hammerschmitt warmly recommended the Encyclopedia Astronautic to anyone interested in space flight, and speculated that its articles might become valued material for future researcher of cultural history.

Reliability controversy
As the web site has not been peer reviewed and errors have been identified which have not been corrected, most space scholars consider the site to be unreliable.

See also
 Jonathan's Space Report
 List of online encyclopedias

References

External links
 

Websites related to spaceflight
Reference websites